Coefficient could have one of the following meanings:

Mathematics  
 A coefficient is a constant multiplication of a function.
 The term differential coefficient has been mostly displaced by the modern term derivative.

Computing 
 In computer arithmetics, the term coefficient (floating point number) is also sometimes used as a synonym for mantissa or significand.

Probability theory and Statistics 
 The coefficient of determination, denoted R2 and pronounced R squared, is the proportion of total variation of outcomes explained by a statistical model.
 The coefficient of variation (CV) is a normalized measure of dispersion of a probability distribution or frequency distribution.
 The correlation coefficient (Pearson's r) is a measure of the linear correlation (dependence) between two variables.

Science 
In physics, a physical coefficient is an important number that characterizes some physical property of an object.
In chemistry, a stoichiometric coefficient is a number placed in front of a term in a chemical equation to indicate how many molecules (or atoms) take part in the reaction.

Other 
UEFA coefficient, used by the governing body for association football in Europe to calculate ranking points for its member clubs and national federations
The Coefficients were an Edwardian London dining club.